Indra Setiawan (born September 11, 1990 in Sidoarjo) is an Indonesian professional footballer who plays as a forward for Liga 2 club Putra Delta Sidoarjo. And he also previously plays for Bhayangkara and PSIS Semarang.

Honours

Individual
 Liga 2 Top Goalscorer: 2018 (29 goals)

References

External links 
 Indra Setiawan at Soccerway
 Indra Setiawan at Liga Indonesia

1990 births
Association football forwards
Living people
People from Sidoarjo Regency
Sportspeople from East Java
Indonesian footballers
Liga 1 (Indonesia) players
Deltras F.C. players
Indonesian Premier Division players
Gresik United players
PSIS Semarang players
Bhayangkara F.C. players